The 2016 Icelandic Women's Football Cup, also known as Borgunarbikar kvenna for sponsorship reasons, was the 36th edition of the Icelandic national football cup.

Calendar
Below are the dates for each round as given by the official schedule:

First round
18 teams began the cup in the first round.

|colspan="3" style="background-color:#97DEFF"|8 May 2016

|-
|colspan="3" style="background-color:#97DEFF"|9 May 2016

|}

Second round

The second round was played on 22–23 May 2017.

|colspan="3" style="background-color:#97DEFF"|22 May 2016

|-
|colspan="3" style="background-color:#97DEFF"|23 May 2016

|}

Round of 16

The Round of 16 were played on 10–12 June 2016.

|colspan="3" style="background-color:#97DEFF"|10 June 2016

|-
|colspan="3" style="background-color:#97DEFF"|11 June 2016

|-
|colspan="3" style="background-color:#97DEFF"|12 June 2016

|}

Quarter-finals

The quarter-finals were played on 4–5 July 2017.

Semi-finals

The semi-finals was played on 22–23 July 2016.

Final

The Final was played on 12 August 2016.

Top goalscorers

References

External links

2016 in Icelandic football
2016 domestic association football cups